Ladla is a 1954 Bollywood film starring Karan Dewan and Shyama, produced and distributed by Varma Films.  It was directed by Surya Kumar and written by Balkrishna Mauj.

Plot
The film's plot revolves around a love triangle. 
Prakash (Karan Dewan), the protagonist in this love triangle, is the son of a very wealthy man, and the darling (Ladla) of the family.  When Prakash decides he wants to be an independent person, he gives up his extravagant lifestyle and together with his friend Johnny (Agha) moves to Bombay, where he gets himself a job and begins a new life.

In Bombay, Prakash meets Neelu (Shyama) and the two of them fall in love.  Surprisingly, a love triangle does not emerge between Prakash, Neelu and Johnny.  Instead, Johnny befriends Sheelu (Krishnakumari) and they too fall in love.  All seems to be going well for all four of them, until Motilal (S. Nazir) enters the picture.  Like Prakash, Motilal is also madly in love with Neelu.

Things become even more complicated when Prakash visits Motilal at his home where, after looking at several photographs, Prakash realises that Motilal is his long-lost brother.

The plot in Ladla progresses with the resolution of the conflict that arises in a love triangle when two brothers are in love with the same woman.

Cast

The roles played by the three participants in the love triangle as well as others are shown below:

Karan Dewan as Prakash
Shyama as Neelu
Agha as Johnny 
Krishnakumari as Sheelu
S. Nazeer as Motilal 
Jeevan 
Raj Mehra 
Dev Kishan

Soundtrack
Music was composed by Vinod, while Kaif Ifrani,  Balkrishna Mauj,  and Raja Mehdi Ali Khan wrote the lyrics.

References

External links

1954 films
1950s Hindi-language films
Indian drama films
1954 drama films
Indian black-and-white films